Simon Fredriksson (born 18 May 1993) is a Swedish ice hockey player. He made his Elitserien debut playing with Färjestads BK during the 2012–13 Elitserien season. He currently plays for the danish team Rungsted Seier Capital of the Danish Metal Ligaen.

References

External links

1993 births
Living people
Swedish ice hockey defencemen
Färjestad BK players